Stenocercus sinesaccus is a species of lizard of the Tropiduridae family. It is found in Brazil.

References

Stenocercus
Reptiles described in 2005
Reptiles of Brazil
Endemic fauna of Brazil